The Stabilisation Force in Bosnia and Herzegovina (SFOR) was a NATO-led multinational peacekeeping force deployed to Bosnia and Herzegovina after the Bosnian war. Although SFOR was led by NATO, several non-NATO countries contributed troops. It was replaced by EUFOR Althea in December 2004.

Mission
The stated mission of SFOR was to "deter hostilities and stabilise the peace, contribute to a secure environment by providing a continued military presence in the Area Of Responsibility (AOR), target and co-ordinate SFOR support to key areas including primary civil implementation organisations, and progress towards a lasting consolidation of peace, without further need for NATO-led forces in Bosnia and Herzegovina".

Structure and history
SFOR was established in Security Council Resolution 1088 on 12 December 1996. It succeeded the much larger Implementation Force IFOR which was deployed to Bosnia and Herzegovina on 20 December 1995 with a one-year mandate. The commanders of the SFOR, who each served one-year terms, were General William W. Crouch, General Eric Shinseki, General Montgomery Meigs, Lt. General Ronald Adams, Lt. General Michael Dodson, Lt. General John B. Sylvester, Lt. General William E. Ward, Major General Virgil Packett and Brigadier General Steven P. Schook.

SFOR operated in support of NATO Operation Joint Guard and Operation Joint Forge.

Troop levels were reduced to approximately 12,000 by the close of 2002, and to approximately 7,000 by the close of 2004. During NATO's 2004 Istanbul Summit the end of the SFOR mission was announced.

It was replaced by the European Union's EUFOR Althea, on 2 December 2004 at NATO HQ, Camp Butmir, Sarajevo, B-H.  Operation Joint Forge was succeeded by the EU's Operation Althea.

SFOR was divided into three zones of operation: 
Mostar MND(S) – Italian, Franco-German, Spanish
Banja Luka MND(W) – American, British, Canadian, Czech, Dutch. The British code name for their activities in  IFOR was Operation Resolute and SFOR was Operation Lodestar (to June 1998) and Operation Palatine (from Jun 1998).  The Canadian mission was named Operation Palladium (1996 to 2004).
Tuzla MND(N) – American, Turkish, Polish, Russian, Norwegian, Swedish, Danish.

(Some units had troops stationed outside the assigned zone)

The three AOs were known collectively as Multi-National Divisions until the end of 2002 where they were reduced in scope to Multi-National Brigades.

SFOR operated under peace enforcement, not peacekeeping, rules of engagement. For example, it was cleared, in 1997, to neutralise Serb radio-television facilities. During its mandate, SFOR arrested 29 individuals who were charged with war crimes. Those  arrested were transferred to the International Criminal Tribunal for the former Yugoslavia in the Netherlands. 
 
U.S. service members serving in SFOR were awarded the Armed Forces Expeditionary Medal and the NATO Medal.

SFOR operated as part of Operation Joint Guard and Operation Joint Forge. As time progressed, the numbers of troops allotted to SFOR declined.  On 2 December 2004, SFOR disbanded and its functions were assumed by military units from the European Union organized as European Union Forces (EUFOR).

Air operations
Several sequential air operations supported the stabilization efforts.
Operation Deny Flight (April 1993 – December 1996)
Operation Decisive Edge (December 1995 – December 1996)
Operation Decisive Guard (December 1996 – June 1998)
Operation Deliberate Forge (June 1998 – September 2004)

Member forces
SFOR participated in Operation Joint Guard (21 December 1996 – 19 June 1998) and Operation Joint Forge (20 June 1998 – 2 December 2004).

NATO nations providing troops included:

Non-NATO nations providing troops included:

See also
National Support Group

References

Further reading

External links

US Air Force News article on Operation Joint Forge

NATO-led peacekeeping in the former Yugoslavia
Law enforcement in Bosnia and Herzegovina
Bosnian War
Military operations involving the United States
Military operations involving Portugal